The Connecticut State Museum of Natural History was located in Storrs, Connecticut, as part of the University of Connecticut.

The small museum contained a variety of scientific and archaeological collections about the cultural history of southern New England. The natural history collections contained "hundreds of thousands of specimens of mammals, birds, insects, invertebrates, fossils, plants, fish and parasites." Since 2004, it housed the Connecticut Archaeology Center, which contained the "largest repository of Connecticut Native American, colonial and industrial artifacts in existence."

In August 2016, the University closed the museum to turn it into administrative office space. Although the museum still exists as a legal entity, it no longer has any physical location or exhibit space.

References

External links
Connecticut State Museum of Natural History - Official site
Visit to the Connecticut State Museum of Natural History - CT Quest, descriptions of exhibits

1988 establishments in Connecticut
2016 disestablishments in Connecticut
Defunct museums in Connecticut
Museums established in 1988
Museums disestablished in 2016
Museums in Tolland County, Connecticut
Native American museums in Connecticut
Natural history museums in Connecticut
Paleontology in Connecticut
University of Connecticut
University museums in Connecticut